The National Collegiate Roller Hockey Association (NCRHA) is an "incorporated not-for-profit corporation" which operates a national collegiate inline hockey league consisting of five divisions of competition (Division I, Division II, Division III, Junior College Division and B Division). Headquartered in Torrance, California, the NCRHA is the national governing body of college inline hockey. The National Collegiate Roller Hockey Championships is held annually to determine the national champions at the end of each season.

The league was organized on August 1, 2003, after the suspension of operations of its predecessor organization, the Collegiate Roller Hockey League (CRHL), which had been founded in 1998. The NCRHA draws many highly skilled players from all over the United States. The NCRHA is not affiliated with the governing body of most college athletics, the National Collegiate Athletic Association (NCAA).

Game

Each National Collegiate Roller Hockey Association game is played between two teams, 4 skaters aside, and is 36 minutes long. The game is composed of three 12–stopped clock periods with an intermission of one–minute between periods. At the end of the 36–minute regulation time, the team with the most goals wins the game. If at the end of regulation time, both teams are tied with the same number of goals, the game shall go to a 3 on 3-five minute sudden death overtime.  If neither team scored after the 5 minutes have elapsed, a winner shall be declared by a shootout.

Ties do not occur during tournament format (such as regional and national championship tournaments) where a winner must be declared to advance to the next round of play. In these cases, sudden-death 12–minute four-on-four periods are played until one team scores. The first team to score a goal in the overtime period shall be declared the winner and advance to the next round.

Inline hockey rink

National Collegiate Roller Hockey Association games are played on a rectangular inline hockey rink with rounded corners surrounded by walls and Plexiglas. As nearly as possible, it measures 80 by 180 feet (24.38 by 54.86 meters) in the NCRHA, with the minimum size of 65 by 145 feet (19.81 by 44.20 meters) and a maximum of 100 by 200 feet (30.48 by 60.96 meters). The center line divides the rink in half, which divides the floor into two attacking zones. Near the end of both ends of the rink, there is a thin red goal line spanning the width of the floor, which is used to judge goals.

Season structure
The National Collegiate Roller Hockey Association season is divided into an exhibition season (October), a regular season (from October through February), regional championships (March) and the National Collegiate Roller Hockey Championships. During the exhibition season, teams usually play other teams in their member organization. During the regular season, clubs play each other in a predefined schedule. The regional championships are tournaments to determine member organization champions and automatic qualifiers for the National Collegiate Roller Hockey Championships. The final remaining team is crowned the national champion.

In the regular season, with the current NCRHA is divided into five divisions, and again geographically split into seven member organizations. Schedules are determined by member organizations, as well as each team. Each team plays the majority of games against intra-organizational opponents. Some teams play select games against inter-organizational opponents.

The NCRHA's regular season standings are based on a point system instead of winning percentages. Points are awarded for each game, where two points are awarded for a win, one point for a tie, and zero points for a loss. At the end of the regular season, most organizations hold a regional championship to determine its champion.

Regional champions along with a set number of at-large teams qualify for the National Collegiate Roller Hockey Championships. Teams are grouped into pools and play a round robin with teams in their respective pool to qualify for a single elimination tournament, with the remaining team being crowned national champion.

Team alignment
The current league organization divides the teams into five divisions: Division I, Division II, Division III, Junior College Division, and B Division. Teams are also grouped geographically into seven Member Organizations. The current organization has roots in the 2006–07 season when the Southeastern Collegiate Roller Hockey League was formed.

List of member organizations

Past Champions

Division I

Division II

Division III

Junior College Division

Division IV

NCRHA Winterfest

2001-2004 - Event was held at NARCH Winternationals
2005 - Event was renamed NCRHA Winter Invitational
2007 - Event was renamed NCRHA Winterfest

External links
Official Site
Eastern Collegiate Roller Hockey Association
Great Plains Collegiate Inline Hockey League
Midwest Collegiate Roller Hockey League
Rocky Mountain Collegiate Roller Hockey Association
Southeastern Collegiate Roller Hockey League
Southwest Collegiate Hockey League
Western Collegiate Roller Hockey League

Sports organizations established in 2003
Sports leagues in the United States
1
Recurring sporting events established in 2003
Sports leagues established in 2003